Ajou is a former commune in the Department of Eure in Normandy. It is located in northern France. On 1 January 2016, it was merged into the new commune of Mesnil-en-Ouche.

Population

See also
Communes of the Eure department

References

Former communes of Eure